Giacomo Jaquerio ( 1375 – 1453) was an Italian medieval painter, one of the main exponents of Gothic painting in Piedmont. He was active in his native Turin, in Geneva and in other localities of Savoy.

Biography
He was born into a family of painters, and his early life he moved frequently from Turin to Geneva, Thonon-les-Bains and other French localities, mostly working for Duke Amadeus VIII of Savoy, noble families and religious institutions. Starting from 1429 he lived in Turin. For the princes of Acaja he frescoed the castle of Turin (the current Palazzo Madama), but his work there has been lost.

His other works include fragments of frescoes with Musician Angels (c. 1410 – 1415) in the Maccabi Chapel of the Cathedral of Geneva, now in that city's Musée d'Art et d'Histoire, and a series of frescoes in the Preceptory of Sant'Antonio in Ranverso (from c. 1410). Also attributed to Jaquerio are two tables with the Stories of St. Peter in the Museo Civico d'Arte Antica in Turin (c. 1410) and a miniature of the Crucifixion (c. 1420) in the Aosta Cathedral Museum.

Sources

External links

1370s births
1435 deaths
Painters from Turin
14th-century Italian painters
Italian male painters
15th-century Italian painters
Gothic painters